Katsanevas is a Greek surname. Notable people with the surname include:

 Stavros Katsanevas (1953–2022), Greek-French physicist
 Theodore Katsanevas (1947–2021), Greek academic and politician

Greek-language surnames